Zimornitsa Peak is the peak rising to 1600 m in Maglenik Heights, north-central Sentinel Range in Ellsworth Mountains, Antarctica.  It is overlooking Kopsis Glacier to the northwest and Young Glacier to the southeast.

The peak is named after the settlement of Zimornitsa in Southern Bulgaria.

Location
US mapping in 1961, updated in 1988.

Maps
 Vinson Massif.  Scale 1:250 000 topographic map.  Reston, Virginia: US Geological Survey, 1988.
 Antarctic Digital Database (ADD). Scale 1:250000 topographic map of Antarctica. Scientific Committee on Antarctic Research (SCAR). Since 1993, regularly updated.

Notes

References
 Zimornitsa Peak. SCAR Composite Antarctic Gazetteer.
 Bulgarian Antarctic Gazetteer. Antarctic Place-names Commission. (details in Bulgarian, basic data in English)

External links
 Zimornitsa Peak. Copernix satellite image

Ellsworth Mountains
Mountains of Ellsworth Land
Bulgaria and the Antarctic